Summer is an English feminine given name of recent coinage derived from the word for the season of summer, the warmest season of the year and a time people generally associate with carefree and fun activities. It has been in common use as a name since at least 1970 in English-speaking countries. Summer, along with other seasonal and nature names, came into fashion as part of the 1960s and 70s counterculture.

The name has ranked among the top 100 names for girls in recent years in Scotland, England, Wales, New Zealand, and Australia. It has ranked among the top 300 names for girls in the United States since 1970 and was the 648th most common name for girls and women in the United States in the 1990 census. It was the 141st most popular name for American girls born in the United States in 2021.

Notable people 
Summer Altice (born December 1979), American model
 Summer Bishil (born 1988), American actress
 Summer Bartholomew (born 1951), winner of the 1975 Miss USA pageant
 Summer Cem (born 1983), German rapper of Turkish descent
 Summer Edward (born 1986), Trinidadian-American writer, children's editor, educator, literary activist, and literature specialist
 Summer Erb (born 1977), American basketball player
 Summer Glau (born 1981), American actress
 Summer Lee (born 1987), American lawyer, community organizer, and Pennsylvania's Democratic representative
 Summer Lochowicz (born 1978), Australian volleyball player
 Summer Meng (born 1991), Taiwanese actress
 Summer Moak (born 1999), American racing cyclist
 Summer Mortimer (born 1993), former Canadian-Dutch paraswimmer
 Summer Phoenix (born 1978), American actress
 Summer Rae (born 1983), American wrestler
 Summer Rayne Oakes (born 1984), American fashion model, environmental activist, author, and entrepreneur
 Summer Ross (born 1992), American beach volleyball player
 Summer Sanders (born 1972), American swimmer and sports commentator
 Summer Stephan, District Attorney for the County of San Diego
 Summer Strallen (born 1985), English actress and musical theatre performer
 Summer Watson (born 1977), British opera singer
 Summer XO (born 1982), American singer
 Summer Walker (born 1996), American singer

Fictional characters
 Cure Summer, protagonist of Tropical-Rouge! Pretty Cure
 Summer Dawson from the novel Wonder
 Summer Finn, from 500 Days of Summer
 Summer Gleeson, from Batman: The Animated Series
 Summer Hathaway, a character in School of Rock
 Summer Hartley, from Definitely, Maybe
 Summer Holiday from The Sims 4
 Summer the Holiday Fairy, from the book franchise Rainbow Magic
 Summer Hoyland, from Neighbours
 Summer Hugglemonster, from the Disney Junior TV series Henry Hugglemonster
 Summer Jones, a.k.a. Wonder, from the film Zoom
 Summer Moran, from Dirk Pitt
 Summer Newman, a character from the American soap opera The Young and the Restless
 Summer Penguin, a new Muppet character created for the Disney Junior reboot of Muppet Babies
 Roberta "Summer" Quinn, a character in the American action drama TV series Baywatch
 Summer Roberts, from The O.C.
 Summer Shaw, from Hollyoaks
 Summer Smith, a character from the Adult Swim cartoon Rick and Morty
 Summer Wheatley, from Napoleon Dynamite
 Summer, one of the characters from the Diva Starz toy line
 Summer, minor character in Futari wa Pretty Cure (originally named Natsuko Koshino)

See also
 Autumn (given name)
 Summer (surname)
 Summer (disambiguation)

Notes

English feminine given names